Al-Naqil Sports Club (meaning Transport Sports Club), was an Iraqi sports club based in Baghdad that was founded in 1937 under the name Al-Sikak Al-Hadeed (meaning Railways). They were renamed Al-Naqil in 1974, competing in the first season of the Iraqi Premier League (the top tier of Iraqi club football) and finishing as runners-up.

The club was dissolved in 1975 as they had no administration or financial backing. Their football players left to join newly-promoted club Al-Zawraa, who went on to become one of Iraqi football's most successful clubs.

Al-Naqil won one trophy in their existence, which was the Independent Baghdad Tournament in 1973, a tournament held to allow teams to continue playing matches after the premature end to the 1972–73 Iraq Central FA First Division. They won the tournament by defeating Aliyat Al-Shorta 3–1 in the final match. They also reached the final of the 1974 Iraq FA Baghdad Cup, but they lost 2–1 against Al-Quwa Al-Jawiya.

Honours

Domestic

National
Iraqi Premier League
Runners-up (1): 1974–75

Regional
Iraq FA Baghdad Cup
Runners-up (1): 1974
Independent Baghdad Tournament
Winners (1): 1973

External links
 Iraqi Football Website

References

Football clubs in Iraq
Football clubs in Baghdad
Railway association football teams
Defunct football clubs in Iraq